Silas Scarboro (died August 7, 1907) was an American politician and physician from Maryland. He served as a member of the Maryland House of Delegates, representing Harford County in 1878 and 1882.

Early life
Silas Scarboro was born in Scarboro, Harford County, Maryland. He graduated from the University of Maryland.

Career
Scarboro served as assistant surgeon of the 2nd Maryland Infantry of the Union Army during the Civil War. He joined the regiment on February 4, 1863. He was in charge of Camp Nelson. He resigned on July 21, 1864.

Scarboro was a Democrat. He served as a member of the Maryland House of Delegates, representing Harford County in 1878 and 1882. He also served as school commissioner of Harford County.

Scarboro practiced medicine. He retired in 1887 due to injury.

Personal life
Scarboro had two daughters and one son, Mrs. J. Sprigg Poole, Bertha and Harold. His son was the editor of Towson News.

Scarboro broke both legs in 1887 when thrown from a sleigh, forcing him to retire. He was a Quaker.

Scarboro died on August 7, 1907, at the age of 80, in Towson. He was buried at Broad Creek Friends' Meeting House Cemetery.

References

Year of birth uncertain
1820s births
1907 deaths
People from Harford County, Maryland
University System of Maryland alumni
Union Army personnel
People of Maryland in the American Civil War
Democratic Party members of the Maryland House of Delegates
Physicians from Maryland
American Quakers